AeroTrain is a  underground people mover system at Washington Dulles International Airport. It was scheduled to open in fall 2009, but was delayed until 2010 in order to complete reliability tests.  It opened to Dulles employees on January 20, 2010, and to passengers January 26, 2010.  The system mostly replaced the mobile lounges that transport passengers from the concourses to the Main Terminal.  The system cost about $1.4 billion and also includes a new security screening mezzanine.  The system utilizes 29 Mitsubishi Heavy Industries Crystal Mover vehicles as its rolling stock.

The AeroTrain transports passengers between the Main Terminal building and Concourses A, B and C.  From the Main Terminal Station, trains travel to Concourse A and Concourse C in one direction, and Concourse B in the other direction.  The track map for AeroTrain is shaped like a fishhook, with the Main Terminal station at the bottom.  The Aerotrain runs 4 three-car trains from 5:00 AM to around 3:00 PM from which seven three-car trains run from 3:00 PM until 11:00 PM.  From midnight to 5 AM there are usually two three-car trains but sometimes only one three-car train.  There are supposed to be no more than two minutes between trains, and trains transport passengers to the concourses in about two minutes, at 40–42 miles per hour (the mobile lounges travel about fifteen miles per hour). 

Since the existing Concourse C/D (built in 1985 and renovated in 2006 to extend its life for 8-10 more years) is a temporary concourse, the Concourse C station has been built at the site of the future permanent Concourse C/D, and is connected to the existing concourse by an underground walkway.

There are also plans for future expansion of the system.  The AeroTrain can be expanded to include stations for the future Concourse D, two stations for an additional midfield Concourse (Concourses E and F), and a South Terminal.  Once fully built out, the trains will run in a two-way loop around the airport.

References

External links
 Dulles International Airport Homepage 

Airport people mover systems in the United States
Crystal Mover people movers
Railway lines opened in 2010
Dulles International Airport
2010 establishments in Virginia